Jerrell Alexander Freeman (born May 1, 1986) is a former American football linebacker. He played college football for the Mary Hardin-Baylor Crusaders under Pete Fredenburg and was signed as an undrafted free agent by the Tennessee Titans of the National Football League (NFL) in 2008. He then played three seasons in the Canadian Football League (CFL) for the Saskatchewan Roughriders, where he led the league in tackles 2011. In 2012, he signed with the Indianapolis Colts of the NFL, and spent two seasons with the Chicago Bears.

College career
Freeman played four seasons of collegiate football for the Mary Hardin-Baylor Crusaders. He was twice named a D3football.com All-American, including being honored as the 2007 D3football.com Defensive Player of the Year. When he left, he was the school's all-time leading tackler. As a senior, he had 59 tackles, 18 tackles for a loss, and six quarterback sacks.

Professional career

Tennessee Titans
Although Freeman was not selected in the 2008 NFL Draft he was signed by the Tennessee Titans immediately following the conclusion of the draft. He became the first Mary Hardin-Baylor Crusader to reach the NFL. Jerrell Freeman was released by the Titans prior to the start of the 2008 NFL season.

Saskatchewan Roughriders
In March 2009, Freeman signed with the Saskatchewan Roughriders of the CFL. In the 2009 CFL season, Freeman was used primarily as a special teams tackler, recording a team high 25 special teams tackles. He was nominated as the team's Most Outstanding Rookie. In his second season with the Riders, Freeman saw more time as a regular linebacker. He made the starting lineup for one game in the regular season and started in two playoff games and the Grey Cup. Jerrell Freeman won CFL Defensive Player of the Week honors in week 7 after recording three sacks against the BC Lions. He led the team in sacks by the end of the season with seven.

The 2011 season was a breakout year for Freeman. Freeman lead the CFL in tackles with 106. Freeman won CFL Defensive Player of the Week in week 10 and earned CFL Defensive Player of the Month for the month of September.

Indianapolis Colts
In January 2012, Freeman signed with the Indianapolis Colts of the NFL. In Week 1 against the Chicago Bears, Freeman returned a Jay Cutler interception for a touchdown in the first quarter. Freeman had an outstanding first season with the Colts finishing with 145 tackles (90 solo and 55 assisted) and two sacks. His 145 tackles was the fifth highest total in the league. Freeman won the AFC Defensive Player of the Week award for his performance in a 23–7 win over the Kansas City Chiefs on December 22, 2013. He finished the game with seven tackles, one quarterback sack, one forced fumble, one interception, and three passes defended. He was also initially credited with two interceptions, but one was later adjusted to a strip/sack for teammate Robert Mathis and a fumble recovery for Freeman. In the 2013 season, he had 5.5 sacks, 126 total tackles, two interceptions, six passes defended, six forced fumbles, and two fumble recoveries. In 2014, he recorded 95 combined tackles, six pass deflections, and one forced fumble in 12 games played. On March 5, 2015, the Colts made a qualifying offer to Freeman, which he signed on April 27. In Week 17 of the 2015 season, Freeman had a 23-yard interception return for a touchdown in the 30–24 victory over the Tennessee Titans. In the 2015 season, he finished with three sacks, 112 total tackles, one interception, two passes defended, and one fumble recovery in 13 games and starts.

Chicago Bears
On March 12, 2016, Freeman signed a three-year, $12 million contract with the Chicago Bears. He was suspended four games on November 21, 2016, for violating the league's performance-enhancing drug policy. In the 2016 season, he appeared in 12 games an finished with 110 total tackles (86 solo) and five passes defended.

On September 12, 2017, Freeman was placed on injured reserve after sustaining a pectoral injury and a concussion in Week 1 against the Atlanta Falcons.

On October 30, the Chicago Bears announced that Freeman had been suspended for 10 games for violating the NFL's performance-enhancing drug policy for a second time. Freeman apologized for the suspension, adding that his playing career might be in jeopardy due to a head injury and memory loss.

On May 2, 2018, Freeman announced his retirement from the NFL. He was suspended an additional two years by the NFL on May 11, 2018, after failing a third drug test.

Career stats

Regular season

Postseason

References

External links

1986 births
Living people
African-American players of American football
African-American players of Canadian football
American football linebackers
Canadian football linebackers
Sportspeople from Waco, Texas
Saskatchewan Roughriders players
Tennessee Titans players
Indianapolis Colts players
Chicago Bears players
University of Mary Hardin–Baylor alumni
Players of American football from Texas
21st-century African-American sportspeople
20th-century African-American people